Musella may refer to:

Musella (plant), a flowering plant genus in the banana and plantain family, considered by some authorities to be a taxonomic synonym of the genus Ensete 
Musella, Georgia, U.S. town in the state of Georgia